Arc is an EP by Agoraphobic Nosebleed, featuring vocalist Kat Katz. It was released on 22 January 2016 via Relapse Records. It is the first in a 4-part series of EPs representing each individual member of the band's vision and influence.

Track listing

Personnel
Katherine "Kat" Katz – vocals
Scott Hull – guitars, bass, drum programming

Production
Scott Hull – recording, mixing, mastering
Orion Landau – design
Eric Lacombe – artwork
Josh Wedin – photography (interior)

References

2016 EPs
Relapse Records EPs
Sludge metal EPs
Agoraphobic Nosebleed albums